Bogomoletz Institute of Physiology of NAS of Ukraine (BIPH) is a scientific institution dedicated to biomedical research in the fields of physiology, biophysics, pathophysiology, neuroscience. It is a leading research center in Ukraine for neuroscience, electrophysiology and cardiovascular diseases.

History 
Predecessors of BIPH were Institute of clinical physiology of Academy of Sciences of Ukrainian SSR (established May 9, 1934) and Institute of experimental biology and pathology of Ministry of Health of Ukrainian SSR (established 1930). Both institutions were led by Ukrainian and Soviet physiologist Alexander A. Bogomolets, who was also president of Academy of Sciences of Ukrainian SSR.

Institutions were united in 1953 and named after Bogomolets.

BIPH became a world-famous center for cellular physiology under his long-standing director Platon Kostiuk who was in charge in 1966–2010. Kostiuk and his students were first to measure calcium currents through neuron soma, distinguish between low-voltage activated calcium channels and high-voltage ones, discover ATP-receptors and ASIC-mediated currents.

Since 2011 Oleh Kryshtal is the director of BIPH.

Journals 
There are several peer-reviewed journals published by the Institute.

Since 1955 "Fiziologychnyi Zhurnal" (for Ukrainian "Physiological Journal") is published. Its first editor was Ivan Pavlov's student Georgiy Volbort. Abstracts of articles are present in PubMed and MEDLINE databases.

Since 2010 Begell House publisher started to publish "International Journal of Physiology and Pathophysiology" containing the best articles from  "Fiziologychnyi Zhurnal".

Since 1969 "Neurophysiology" journal was established by Platon Kostiuk, which was the first scientific journal dedicated to neuroscience in Soviet Union. It was translated into English by Plenum Publishing Corp.

References

Sources 
 

Institutes of the National Academy of Sciences of Ukraine
Neuroscience research centers in Ukraine
National Landmarks in Kyiv
Medical research institutes in the Soviet Union
1934 establishments in the Soviet Union